John Barneby (20 November 1799 – 30 November 1846) was a British Conservative politician.

He was a member of the Carlton Club, Boodle's and Arthur's.

References

External links
 

1799 births
1846 deaths
UK MPs 1835–1837
UK MPs 1837–1841
UK MPs 1841–1847
Conservative Party (UK) MPs for English constituencies